Vorfë (also known as Vorfë e Poshtëm) is a settlement in the former Gruemirë municipality, Shkodër County, northern Albania. At the 2015 local government reform it became part of the municipality Malësi e Madhe.

References

Gruemirë
Populated places in Malësi e Madhe
Villages in Shkodër County